Gersem (c. 600) was a King of the Kingdom of Aksum in Northeast Africa. He is primarily known through the Aksumite currency that was minted during his reign.

Munro-Hay suggests that either Gersem or Armah were the last Aksumite Kings to issue coins. However, no gold coins belonging to Armah have been found, and the Gersem mint is assumed to be the last coin in gold.1

Gersem was succeeded atop the throne by Armah.

Egyptologist E. A. Wallis Budge theorised that this king's named was influenced by the Biblical name Gershom.

The official king list of the Ethiopian monarchy from 1922 lists a similarly named king called "Germa Asfar" who reigned from 631 to 645 (Ethiopian Calendar). This could be the same king as Gersem based on dating, but the list names a different predecessor and successor for him, with Akala Wedem being the previous king and Zergaz being the next king. A manuscript held in the British Museum also states that a king named "Germa Safar" succeeded Akala Wedem and was succeeded by Zergaz. This list claims he was the 13th king to reign after Abreha and Atsbeha. A king list recorded by Egyptologist Henry Salt in 1814 also records a similar line of succession, although the king is called "Grim Sofar" instead of Germa or Gersem and is the 10th king to reign after Abreha and Atsbeha. Neither of these king lists provide reign dates.

Carlo Conti Rossini recorded a different king list in 1903 that stated that king "Germa Sor" was the 15th king after Abreha and Atsbeha and was preceded by Degzan and succeeded by Akala Wedem.

Notes 
 S. C. Munro-Hay, Aksum: An African Civilization of Late Antiquity (Edinburgh: University Press, 1991), p. 91.

References 

Kings of Axum
7th-century monarchs in Africa
6th-century monarchs in Africa